Io Grido is the first solo album of Grido, released on May 3, 2011.
The album debuted in ninth position on the Italian chart FIMI.

Track listing

References

2011 albums
Grido (rapper) albums